Richard Chadwick may refer to:

 Richard Chadwick, drummer with Hawkwind
 Richard Chadwick (footballer) (1860–?), English footballer who played for Stoke